This is a list of acts of the Parliament of South Africa enacted in the years 1990 to 1999.

South African acts are uniquely identified by the year of passage and an act number within that year. Some acts have gone by more than one short title in the course of their existence; in such cases each title is listed with the years in which it applied.

1990

1991

1992

1993

1994

The following proclamations issued by the President under section 237(3) of the Interim Constitution are regarded as having status equivalent to that of an Act of Parliament:
 Proclamation No. 103 of 1994: Public Service Act, 1994
 Proclamation No. 105 of 1994: Public Service Labour Relations Act, 1994
 Proclamation No. 138 of 1994: Educators' Employment Act, 1994

1995

1996

1997

1998

1999

References
 Government Gazette of the Republic of South Africa, Volumes 297–414.
 
 

1990